Gurja Himal is a mountain in Gandaki Province, Nepal.

In 2018, an avalanche from the mountain killed nine people which was labelled as the  worst climbing disaster in Nepal after the 2015 Mount Everest avalanches. One of the victims was South Korean mountain climber Kim Chang-ho. 

Gurja Himal was first climbed on 1 November 1969 by a Japanese expedition.

References

External links 

 Gurja Himal at Nepal Himal Peak Profile

Seven-thousanders of the Himalayas
Mountains of the Gandaki Province